The Friedrichshafen N.I was a German prototype night bomber built by Friedrichshafen during World War I.

Design and development
The Friedrichshafen N.I was a two-seat biplane equipped with a  Mercedes D.IVa engine, double-mainwheel tri-cycle landing gear and large relatively highly swept biplane wings. It flew in 1917, but flight testing revealed a number of deficiencies, the main one of which was the large length of the nose, which made it difficult for the pilot to get a look at landing, especially at night.

See also

References

Bibliography
 

1910s German bomber aircraft
N.I
Aircraft first flown in 1917